Straight is a 2009 Indian film starring Vinay Pathak and Gul Panag in the lead roles. It is directed by Parvati Balagopalan, and produced by Idream Productions. The film is also shot in a restaurant in Leicester square, London and some parts are shot in Wembley. This movie marks the debut of a new actor named Anuj who plays a part in the love triangle. It also features Snigdha Pandey,  Siddharth Makkar, Rasik Dave, Ketki Dave and Damandeep Singh in supporting roles.

Plot 
In the midst of central London, a successful Indian restaurant called 'Gaylord' is run by a Londoner of Indian origin called Pinu Patel (Vinay Pathak) . A simple soul at heart, Pinu has many complexes - a special one being that even at the age of 40, he is a virgin and has never experienced intimacy with any woman. He agrees to come to India to have an arranged marriage with Payal (Snigdha Pandey), but is crest fallen when his fiancée elopes on the wedding day, leaving a note behind ridiculing Pinu and his personality. This fuels Pinu's biggest fear of being laughed at by people... an ever-repeating phenomenon with him. Pinu is quite an introvert and has no real friends...the closest he has ever gotten to a friendship is with his foster brother Rajat (Siddharth Makkar), who is quite a contrast to his own personality. A casual air about him, he is the lead singer of a rock band. Rajat is very fond of Pinu, though is often a source of annoyance to him as he finds Pinu really funny.

One day, a young Indian fellow called Kamlesh comes to his restaurant and asks for a job as a stand-up comedian. Quite thrown off, Pinu initially refuses but finally lets him join as a cook, who also does a stand-up act in the evenings. On the same day, he hires a new cashier - Renu (Gul Panag), a young art student from India, who has a passion for caricatures. Life changes dramatically for Pinu as his restaurant Gaylord begins to transform... Renu works on the get-up of the place, makes cheerful caricatures for customers while Kamlesh is a fabulous cook with a great talent for making people laugh in his acts. Soon, the restaurant is more happening and the business is much better than before. But the greatest difference Kamlesh and Renu bring to his life is friendship. There is a visible difference in Pinu's personality now as he lets himself hang out a bit with them.

One fine day, Pinu is thrown into a daze as he walks away from the restaurant ...he has discovered a totally new fear that he might be gay.

On a mission now, Pinu goes on a rampage seeking available women for a sexual rendezvous. However, it leads to him suffering another string of tragicomic situations, ending up feeling humiliated. He gets engaged to Priyanka and the marriage is fixed. Then after Rajat explains to him that love is the essence of life, Pinu realizes that he loves Renu. On the day of the wedding with Priyanka, Pinu with the help of Rajat and Kamlesh, stops the marriage and Pinu runs away to meet Renu and propose to her for marriage, which she gladly accepts. The film ends on a happy note and finally Pinu gets happily married to his love.

Cast

Crew 
 Director: Parvati Balagopalan
 Production house: Idream Productions
 Music director: Sagar Desai
 Lyricist: Subrata Sinha

References 

http://www.gulpanag.net/films/straight.php
http://www.glamsham.com/movies/previews/31-straight-movie-preview-050801.asp

External links
gulpanag.com

2009 films
2000s Hindi-language films
Indian sex comedy films
Indian LGBT-related films
2009 LGBT-related films
Sony Pictures films
Columbia Pictures films
Sony Pictures Networks India films